The Tecnológico de Antioquia (TdeA) (English: Antioquia Institute of Technology), also called Tecnológico de Antioquia – University Institute, is an academic institution of higher education in Colombia in the department of Antioquia, provides technical education services, technology and professional. Its headquarters are located in Robledo, in the city of Medellín.

Campus

The campus has an area of 38 thousand square meters, which has spacious and comfortable spaces, surrounded by more than 13 thousand square meters of green areas.
It has academic, administrative, library, study areas, computer block, laboratories, covered arena, gym, pool, soccer field sports facilities, cafes and parks, among others.

Faculties
The institution has 40 programs, professional technical levels, technological and university professional in undergraduate and graduate, all with qualified registration and one high quality accreditation (preschool), offered through five faculties: education and social sciences, forensic and health, informatics, management, and earth sciences and environment.

External links

 Tecnológico de Antioquia

References

Universities and colleges in Colombia
Universities and colleges in Medellín
Educational institutions established in 1983
1983 establishments in Colombia